Torve is a Norwegian surname. Notable people with the surname include:

 Kelvin Torve (born 1960), American baseball player and coach
 Kristian Torve (born 1993), Norwegian politician
 Tove-Lise Torve (born 1964), Norwegian politician

See also
 Tore

Norwegian-language surnames